Ilya Sergeyevich Gomanyuk (born 20 May 2000) is a Russian football player. He plays for FC Tver.

Club career
On 15 June 2021, he joined FC Volgar Astrakhan on loan for the 2021–22 season.

He made his debut in the Russian Football National League for FC Volgar Astrakhan on 10 July 2021 in a game against FC Orenburg.

References

External links
 
 Profile by Russian Football National League

2000 births
Sportspeople from Bryansk
Living people
Russian footballers
Russia youth international footballers
Association football forwards
FC Dynamo Moscow reserves players
FC Volgar Astrakhan players
Russian First League players
Russian Second League players